1st Aviation Regiment may refer to:

1st Aviation Regiment (Australia)
1st Aviation Regiment (Poland)
1st Aviation Regiment (United States)